Law School is a South Korean television series starring Kim Myung-min, Kim Bum, Ryu Hye-young, and Lee Jung-eun. It premiered on JTBC on April 14, 2021 and aired every Wednesday and Thursday at 21:00 KST. The episodes are available for streaming on Netflix.

Synopsis
Set in Hankuk University Law School, the series tells the story of students and professors in the law school who come across an unusual case.
A professor at a prestigious law school and his students get involved in an unprecedented case. A drama about the process of prospective lawyers realizing authenticity, law, and justice.

During a supervised mock trial class, a law school professor is found dead at the school, and Professor Yang is arrested as the main suspect. Kang Sol, Han Joon-Hwi, and other students at Hankuk work together to reveal the truth behind Professor Seo's death and prove Professor Yang's innocence.

Cast

Main
 Kim Myung-min as Yang Jong-hoon, a prosecutor-turned-professor who teaches criminal law. He is stern and cold but people close to him know how he really is.
 Kim Bum as Han Joon-hwi, a first-year student who always gets the top grades among his peers. He is a smart student who also is the nephew of the murdered professor.
An Seong-won as young Joon-hwi
 Ryu Hye-young as Kang Sol A, a first-year student who entered law school through special admission. She was barely able to get into law school and is Ye-Seul's good friend. She also is the twin sister of Erica Shin. 
 Lee Jung-eun as Kim Eun-sook, a judge-turned-professor who teaches civil law. She is a 'Fun to be with' professor who is liked by her students. She is a good friend of Professor Yang and tried her best to prove him innocent.

Supporting

Hankuk University Law School Faculty 

 Ahn Nae-sang as Seo Byung-ju
 Gil Hae-yeon as Oh Jung-hee
 Woo Hyun as Sung Dong-il
 Oh Man-seok as Kang Joo-man
 Lee Seung-hun as Jung Dae-hyeon

Hankuk University Law School Students 
 Lee Soo-kyung as Kang Sol B, a first-year student. She is Kang Sol A's roommate. She belongs to a rich family and is continuously pressurized by her mother to perform well and get to the top.
 Lee David as Seo Ji-ho. He is a smart yet indifferent student who is trying to get revenge for his father's death. 
 Go Youn-jung as Jeon Ye-seul, a first-year student. She is abused by her boyfriend who is Assemblyman Ko's son as well.
 Hyun Woo as Yoo Seung-jae, a former medical student who turned to law school. He always scores the best marks until one day when a secret of his is revealed.
 Lee Kang-ji as Min Bok-gi
 Kim Min-seok as Jo Ye-beom

Prosecutors' Office 

 Park Hyuk-kwon as Jin Hyeong-woo
 Kim Yong-joon as Chief Prosecutor Kim
 Min Dae-shik

Kang Sol A's Family 

 Shin Mi-young as Kang Sol A's mother
 Park So-yi as Kang Byeol - Kang Sol A's younger sister
 Ryu Hye-young as Kang Dan / Erica Shin, Sol A’s twin sister who has a secret story. She decided to move to Boston, USA.

Others 
 Jung Won-Joong as Assemblyman Ko Hyeong-su
Jo Jae-ryong as Lee Man-ho
Lee Hwi-jong as Ko Young-chang
Lee Chun-hee as Park Geun-tae
Sung Yeo-jin as Han Joon-hwi's aunt
Park Mi-hyeon as Han Hye-gyeong
Actor Unknown as Choi Jae-Cheol

Production

Development
The then network-less project was first announced by the production company Gonggamdong House in June 2018 under the working title Law School Monsters, making it South Korea's first law school television series, with Seo In (Judge vs. Judge) as the writer. JTBC acquired the broadcasting rights in the summer of 2020.

Casting
In mid-September 2020, JTBC confirmed that Kim Myung-min, Kim Bum, Ryu Hye-young, and Lee Jung-eun would star in the series.

Kim Seok-yoon, who previously collaborated with actors Kim Myung-min and Kim Bum on the Detective K film series, joined the project as the director. He is also a co-producer for the series, together with Gonggamdong House's Choi Sai-rack.

Original soundtrack

Part 1

Part 2

Part 3

Viewership

References

External links
  
 
 

JTBC television dramas
2021 South Korean television series debuts
South Korean legal television series
Television series by JTBC Studios
Korean-language Netflix exclusive international distribution programming
2021 South Korean television series endings
Television series about prosecutors